Łukasz Łapszyński (born 23 September 1993) is a Polish volleyball player, a member of the Polish club Stal Nysa, PlusLiga.

Career

Clubs
In 2008 he was U19 Polish Champion with MMKS Kędzierzyn-Koźle. In 2012 he achieved gold medal of second Polish league with Czarni Radom. In next two years he gained with Cuprum Lubin two bronze medals of first Polish league. In 2015 he debuted in PlusLiga as AZS Politechnika Warszawska player. After one season he signed another contract with the same team.

Personal life
In 2014 he donated bone marrow for an 8 year old girl.

External links
 Player profile at PlusLiga.pl
 Player profile at Volleybox.net

References

1993 births
Living people
People from Wołów
Sportspeople from Lower Silesian Voivodeship
Cuprum Lubin players
Projekt Warsaw players
Effector Kielce players
Stal Nysa players